Sergey Borisov (born October 18, 1985) is a Russian professional ice hockey goaltender who currently plays for  Amur Khabarovsk in the Kontinental Hockey League.

References

 

1985 births
Living people
Atlant Moscow Oblast players
Khimik-SKA Novopolotsk players
HC Spartak Moscow players
Severstal Cherepovets players
Ice hockey people from Moscow
Russian ice hockey goaltenders